Darbas is a village in the Sisian Municipality of the Syunik Province in Armenia. Saint Stephen's Church of Darbas was opened in 2010. The school and health clinic in Darbas are the largest and most resourced in the Darbas valley. There are primary schools and basic health clinics in both Darbas and the nearby village of Shamb.

Demographics 
ARMSTAT reported the village's population as 556 at the 2011 census, In the 2001 census, Darbas had a population of 698.

Municipal administration 
The village was the center of the Darbas community, which contained the villages of Darbas, the nearby village of Shamb until the June 2017 administrative and territorial reforms, when the village became a part of the Sisian Municipality. The distance between Darbas and Shamb is approximately 8 kilometers by road.

References 

Populated places in Syunik Province